The pygmy lanternshark (Etmopterus fusus) is a shark of the family Etmopteridae found in the eastern Indian Ocean from northern Western Australia and possibly Java, at depths of between 430 and 550 m.  Its length is up to 26 cm.

Reproduction is ovoviviparous.

References

 
 Compagno, Dando, & Fowler, Sharks of the World, Princeton University Press, New Jersey 2005 

Etmopterus
Taxa named by Peter R. Last
Taxa named by George H. Burgess
Taxa named by Bernard Séret
Fish described in 2002